Peter R. Adam (born 29 May 1957) is a German film editor. He has worked on such films as An American Werewolf in Paris, Good Bye, Lenin!, and Anonymous. Adam was one of the first to use digital editing tools. He won the Deutscher Filmpreis for editing in 1998 for his work on Comedian Harmonists.

References

External links
 

1957 births
Living people
German Film Award winners
German film editors
People from Pirmasens
Film people from Rhineland-Palatinate